Delias microsticha is a butterfly in the family Pieridae. It was described by Walter Rothschild in 1904. It is endemic to New Guinea.

Subspecies
D. m. microsticha (Central Highlands, Papua New Guinea)
D. m. flavopicta Jordan, [1912] (Arfak Mountains, Irian Jaya)
D. m. serratula Toxopeus, 1955 Weyland Mountains, through the Snow Mountains to the Central Mountains, Irian Jaya
D. m. weja Mastrigt, 2006 (Foja Mountains, Irian Jaya)

References

External links
Delias at Markku Savela's Lepidoptera and Some Other Life Forms

microsticha
Butterflies described in 1904
Endemic fauna of New Guinea